Al Jaish is Arabic for army, and may refer to:

 Tala'ea El Gaish SC, a football club based in Cairo, Egypt
 Al-Jaish FC (Iraq), a football club based in Baghdad, Iraq
 Al-Jaish SC (Syria), a football club based in Damascus, Syria
 El Jaish SC, a football club that represents the Qatar Armed Forces
El Jaish SC (handball), a handball club that represents the Qatar Armed Forces
El Jaish SC (volleyball), a volleyball club that represents the Qatar Armed Forces

Military association football clubs